Emma Forrest (born 26 December 1976) is a British-American film director, screenwriter and novelist.

Early life
Forrest was born in London, England, to a Jewish family. Her American mother, Judy Raines, was also a writer, mainly for British television, whereas her father is British.

Journalism
At age fifteen, Emma Forrest wrote a story on Madonna for the London Evening Standard.  She left school to write her "Generation X" column for the Sunday Times, writing about various britpop/indie bands "on the road". The vanished Manic Street Preacher member Richey Edwards was the first person interviewed.

Forrest has worked for Vogue, Vanity Fair, Harper’s Bazaar, Time Out, The Guardian, NME, Interview and Blackbook, where she interviewed Snoop Dogg and Brad Pitt. In the autumn of 2011, she contributed an essay to the album Ceremonials by Florence and the Machine that was included in the CD booklet.

Novels
Forrest has written four novels: Namedropper (1998), Thin Skin (2002), Cherries in the Snow (2005), and Royals, which was released in the UK on 31 October 2019.

Anthologies
In 2001 Forrest contributed to an anthology on the writer J.D. Salinger titled Love & Squalor, with an essay describing Salinger's influence on some current young writers. In 2007 she co-wrote and edited her first non-fiction book, Damage Control – Women on the Therapists, Beauticians, and Trainers Who Navigate Their Bodies, which was an anthology of essays of the emotional pain women suffer for their own physical wellbeing. The book features contributions from many well-known women, including Helen Oyeyemi, Marian Keyes and Sarah Jones.

Memoir

Forrest wrote a memoir, Your Voice in My Head (2011), concerning the death of her psychiatrist and her subsequent break-up with her partner. The memoir was announced as a feature film adaptation to be written by Forrest and directed by Francesca Gregorini, with Emma Watson in the lead role.

In August 2022, Forrest published a second memoir, Busy Being Free concerning her divorce and return to living in London as a single parent.

Screenwriting
A screenplay by Forrest about the late musician Jeff Buckley, Becoming Music, was bought by Brad Pitt's production company Plan B Entertainment in September 2000. In 2009 her screenplay LIARS (AE) was bought by Scott Rudin at Miramax, with Richard Linklater attached to direct. In 2009 she was listed on Variety'''s "Top Ten Screenwriters to Watch". Other screenplays in development:Know Your Rights (Film4) and How Could You Do This To Me (Paramount Pictures).

Personal life
Forrest was in a relationship with actor Colin Farrell, whom she met in 2008. She refers to him in her memoir as "GH," short for "Gypsy Husband."

In June 2012, Forrest married Australian actor Ben Mendelsohn, who won notice in Animal Kingdom. They had one child together in 2014, and divorced in 2016.

She has been diagnosed with bipolar disorder and borderline personality disorder.

Filmography
 Untogether'' (2017) (director, screenplay)

References

1976 births
Living people
20th-century American novelists
20th-century English novelists
21st-century American novelists
21st-century English novelists
English women journalists
English women novelists
British screenwriters
English Jewish writers
Writers from Los Angeles
American women journalists
American women novelists
American women screenwriters
Jewish American novelists
British emigrants to the United States
People with bipolar disorder
People with borderline personality disorder
Screenwriters from California
English women non-fiction writers
Writers from London
20th-century American women writers
21st-century American women writers
20th-century English women
20th-century English people
21st-century English women
21st-century American Jews